Cleonyminae is a parasitic wasp family formerly treated as a subfamily within Pteromalidae.

Genera

 Agamerion
 Agrilocida
 Amazonisca
 Boucekius
 Callocleonymus
 Chadwickia
 Chalcedectus
 Chalcidiscelis
 Cleonymus
 Dasycleonymus
 Epistenia
 Eupelmophotismus
 Grooca
 Hadroepistenia
 Hedqvistia
 Heydenia
 †Heydeniopsis
 Lycisca
 Marxiana
 Mesamotura
 Neboissia
 Neoepistenia
 Nepistenia
 Notanisus
 Oodera
 Paralycisca
 Parepistenia
 Proglochin
 Proshizonotus
 Protoepistenia
 Riekisura
 Romanisca
 Scaphepistenia
 Shedoepistenia
 Solenura
 Striatacanthus
 Thaumasura
 Urolycisca
 Westwoodiana
 Zolotarewskya

References

External links 

Pteromalidae